The hooded treepie (Crypsirina cucullata) is a species of bird in the family Corvidae.
It is endemic to Myanmar.

Its natural habitats are subtropical or tropical moist lowland forest and subtropical or tropical dry shrubland.
It is threatened by habitat loss.

It has grey plumage apart from black head, tail and flight feathers.

References

 Madge and Burn, Crows and Jays  

hooded treepie
Birds of Myanmar
Endemic fauna of Myanmar
hooded treepie
Taxonomy articles created by Polbot